Bard SummerScape is an annual eight-week-long arts festival held during the months of June, July, and August at Bard College. Since its inaugural season in 2003, the festival is held in tandem with the Bard Music Festival and features performances of opera, dance, theater, music, film, and cabaret. The festival attracts professional artists from around the world. Concerts and productions are held at a variety of venues on the college's campus, including the Richard B. Fisher Center for the Performing Arts.

External links
Official website

Opera festivals
Theatre festivals in the United States
Festivals in New York (state)
Festivals established in 2002
2002 establishments in New York (state)
Annandale-on-Hudson, New York
Bard College